James or Jim Elliot(t) may refer to:
James Elliott (actor) (1928–2011), British-born, Australia based actor
Jumbo Elliott (coach) (1915–1981), nickname of James Elliott, athletics coach
Jumbo Elliott (baseball) (1900–1970), professional baseball player
James Elliott (musician) (born 1976), American electronic musician, also known as Ateleia
James Elliot (politician) (1775–1839), Vermont Congressman
James Elliott (footballer), English footballer
James Elliott, Jr., founder of Phi Gamma Delta fraternity in 1848
James Douglas Elliott (1859–1933), U.S. federal judge
James L. Elliot (1943–2011), Massachusetts Institute of Technology Professor of Physics and Planetary Science
 Sir James Elliott (medical administrator) (1880–1959), New Zealand doctor, editor, medical administrator and writer
James T. Elliott (1823–1875), U.S. Representative from Arkansas
James William Elliott (1833–1915), English collector of nursery rhymes
Jim Eliot, English musician and member of the band Kish Mauve
Jim Elliot (1927–1956), Christian missionary to Ecuador
Jim Elliott (born 1942), American politician
Jimmy Elliott (1838–1883), Irish-American boxer
Jimmy Elliott (footballer) (1891–?), English footballer and manager
James Dudley Elliott, Australian judge
James Philip Elliott (1929–2008), British theoretical nuclear physicist
James Elliott (editor) (–1883), editor and part proprietor of The Kapunda Herald
James Elliott (curler), Scottish wheelchair curler

See also
Jamie Elliott (disambiguation)